The Deep Ecliptic Survey (DES) is a project to find Kuiper belt objects (KBOs), using the facilities of the National Optical Astronomy Observatory (NOAO). The principal investigator is Robert L. Millis.

Since 1998 through the end of 2003, the survey covered 550 square degrees with sensitivity of 22.5, which means an estimated 50% of objects of this magnitude have been found.

The survey has also established the mean Kuiper Belt plane and introduced new formal definitions of the dynamical classes of Kuiper belt objects.

The remarkable first observations and/or discoveries include:
 28978 Ixion, large plutino
 19521 Chaos (cubewano)
 , the first binary trans-Neptunian object (TNO)
 , the first object with perihelion too far to be affected (scattered) by Neptune and a large semi-major axis
 , remarkable for its semi-major axis of more than 500 AU and extreme eccentricity (0.96) taking the object from the inside of the Neptune's orbit to more than 1000 AU
 , the first Neptune trojan
, with one of the most inclined orbits (>68°)

References

External links 
 https://web.archive.org/web/20040612003417/http://www.lowell.edu/Research/DES/

Astronomical surveys
Asteroid surveys